The Mahathala ameria, the falcate oakblue, is a species of blue butterfly, of the family Lycaenidae found in South-East Asia.

Range
The butterfly occurs in India from Bengal to Assam, the Khasi Hills, and other parts of north-east India into southern Myanmar, Thailand, Laos and Java. It is also found in western and southern China, Hainan and Taiwan.

Subspecies
M. a. ameria West China, Bengal, Assam, Burma
M. a. zistra Fruhstorfer, 1908 - Thailand
M. a. javana Fruhstorfer, 1908 - Java
M. a. hainani Bethune-Baker, 1903 - Indo China, South China, Hainan, Taiwan

Status
Rare.

See also
List of butterflies of India (Lycaenidae)

References

Further reading
 
 
 
 
 

Mahathala
Butterflies of Asia
Butterflies of Indochina
Taxa named by William Chapman Hewitson
Butterflies described in 1862